Agnes Gund (born 1938) is an American philanthropist and arts patron, collector of modern and contemporary art, and arts education and social justice advocate. She is President Emerita and Life Trustee of the Museum of Modern Art (MoMA) and Chairman of its International Council. She is a board member of MoMA PS1. In 1977, in response to New York City's fiscal crisis that led to budget cuts that virtually eliminated arts education in public schools, Gund founded Studio in a School, a nonprofit organization that engages professional artists as art instructors in public schools and community-based organizations to lead classes in drawing, printmaking, painting, collage, sculpture, and digital media, and to work with classroom teachers, administrators, and families to incorporate visual art into their school communities.

Early life and education 
Gund became interested in art while a 15-year-old student at Miss Porter's School in Farmington, Connecticut. "I had a magical art history teacher who didn't just give you the artist's name and the date of the picture, she showed you how to look at artwork," Gund said. Later, Gund attended Connecticut College for Women, where she received a bachelor's degree in history. She received her master's degree in art history from Harvard's Fogg Museum.

Career 

Gund joined MoMA's International Council in 1967; she then joined the Board of Trustees in 1976 and served as its President from 1991 until 2002. She serves on the boards of the Cleveland Museum of Art, the Foundation for Art and Preservation in Embassies, and the Morgan Library and Museum. She is co-founder and Chair Emerita of the Center for Curatorial Leadership and is an Honorary Trustee of YoungArts, Independent Curators International and the Museum of Contemporary Art, Cleveland.

A civic leader and staunch supporter of education, women's issues and environmental concerns, among other causes, Gund is the former Chair of the Mayor's Cultural Affairs Advisory Commission of New York City, a former member of the New York State Council on the Arts, and has served on the boards of such wide-ranging organizations as the Aaron Diamond AIDS Research Center, the Andy Warhol Foundation, the Barnes Foundation, Chess in the Schools, the Frick Collection, the Foundation for Contemporary Art, the Fund for Public Schools, the J. Paul Getty Trust, and the Robert Rauschenberg Foundation.

In 1997, Gund received the National Medal of Arts from President Bill Clinton, the highest award given to artists and arts patrons by the U.S. government. In 1998, Gund received the Golden Plate Award of the American Academy of Achievement. In 2011, Gund was nominated by President Barack Obama as a member of the Board of Trustees of the National Council on the Arts. In 2016, she was elected Honorary Fellow of the Royal Academy of Arts. In 2018, she was awarded the J. Paul Getty Medal.

On February 14, 2020, Gund was presented with the first-ever “Justice Ruth Bader Ginsburg Woman of Leadership Award” in honor of Justice Ginsburg’s exemplary career and life. In October 2022, Gund received the W.E.B. Du Bois Medal, the highest honor given by Harvard University in the field of African and African American studies.

Art for Justice Fund 

In January 2017, Gund sold Roy Lichtenstein's Masterpiece in order to provide $100 million in seed funding for the Art for Justice Fund, which supports criminal justice reform and seeks to reduce mass incarceration in the United States. Gund described Michelle Alexander's 2010 book The New Jim Crow: Mass Incarceration in the Age of Colorblindness and Ava DuVernay's 2016 documentary 13th about African-Americans in the prison system as motivators for starting the fund, as well as concern for her grandchildren, six of whom are Black.

Studio in a School 

Agnes Gund is Founder and Chair Emerita of Studio in a School. Now in its fifth decade, Studio in a School has provided visual art instruction led by professional artists to over one million students through its New York City School Programs. Since its founding in 1977, Studio has partnered with over 800 schools and community-based organizations throughout the five boroughs of New York City. Every year, more than 100 professional artists devote some 45,000 hours to over 32,000 pre-k through high school students, often in schools that would otherwise lack visual arts instruction. About 90 percent of all children who participate in Studio programs come from low-income families. Studio's New York City School Programs include the multi-year, full-time Long Term Program, an Early Childhood Program, and more flexible Residency Programs.

In 2016, Studio in a School launched the Studio Institute under the leadership of long-time Studio President Thomas Cahill. The goal of the Studio Institute is to expand the organization's mission and impact on the field through research, documentation, and dissemination, and to share its programs with other cities around the country. By 2018, the Studio Institute had provided expanded programming in five cities: Boston, Philadelphia, Providence, Cleveland, and Memphis.

In 2017, Studio in a School received the National Arts Award for Arts Education from Americans for the Arts.

Collecting 

Agnes Gund's vast collection of modern and contemporary art from the 1940s through the present ranges from modern masters, including Richard Artschwager, John Baldessari, Lynda Benglis, Lee Bontecou, James Lee Byars, Vija Celmins, Eva Hesse, Arshile Gorky, Jasper Johns, Ellsworth Kelly, Wolfgang Laib, Roy Lichtenstein, Martin Puryear, Robert Rauschenberg, Mark Rothko, Richard Serra, and Frank Stella; through cutting-edge contemporary artists, such as Teresita Fernandez, Kara Walker, Lorna Simpson, Cai Guo-Qiang, Glenn Ligon and David Remfry.

Her collection consists of paintings, sculptures, photographs, prints, and furniture, with an exceptionally rich compilation of drawings. She has donated hundreds of works to MoMA, numerous works to the Cleveland Museum of Art, and has given or loaned various pieces to museums around the country. Essentially all of her most valuable works that have not already been gifted are promised gifts to institutions.

Honorary doctorates 

She has received honorary doctorate degrees from the CUNY Graduate Center (2007), University of Illinois (2002), Brown University (1996), Kenyon College (1996), Case Western Reserve University (1995), Hamilton College (1994),  Bowdoin College (2012), and University of the Arts (Philadelphia) (2021).

Family and personal life 

A native of Cleveland, Ohio, Gund's father, George Gund II, was president and chairman of Cleveland Trust when it was Ohio's largest bank. Born in 1938, she is the second oldest of six children. Two of her brothers, Gordon Gund and George Gund, partners in Gund Investment Corporation, were the former owners of the San Jose Sharks (National Hockey League) and Cleveland Cavaliers (National Basketball Association). Her brother Graham is an architect; her brother Geoff is a career teacher of economics and American history; and her sister, Louise Gund, is a Tony Award-winning theater producer, environmentalist, women's activist, and philanthropist.

Gund was married to Albrecht "Brec" Saalfield, an heir to the Saalfield Publishing Company of Akron, Ohio. They had four children: David, Catherine, Jessica and Anna. Gund later married attorney, Hunter College philosophy instructor and Columbia University and Benjamin N. Cardozo School of Law instructor Daniel Shapiro.

Gund resides in New York City.

References

External links 
Studio Visit: Selected Gifts from Agnes Gund, MoMA
MoMA Audio for Studio Visit: Selected Gifts from Agnes Gund
MoMA Trustees
Studio in a School website
Art for Justice Fund website

1938 births
Living people
People associated with the Museum of Modern Art (New York City)
Harvard University alumni
Connecticut College alumni
Miss Porter's School alumni
American art collectors
American women philanthropists
Philanthropists from New York (state)
People from Cleveland
Philanthropists from Ohio
Women art collectors
20th-century American philanthropists
21st-century philanthropists
20th-century women philanthropists
21st-century women philanthropists